Team Nutrition is the USDA implementation vehicle for its School Meals Initiative for Healthy Children, which began in 1995. Among other things, it provides grants to state agencies that apply for and meet the criteria for delivering new and innovative programs that provide training to school food personnel, nutrition education to children and their parents, and support healthy eating and physical activities involving school, child care, and community groups. The program is authorized and funded under annual agriculture appropriations laws. Team Nutrition has provided $38.6 million in food service training grants to state agencies over 10 years from FY1995 through FY2004.

References

External links
 Team Nutrition website

United States Department of Agriculture